Danaus erippus, the southern monarch, is a milkweed butterfly (subfamily Danainae) in the family Nymphalidae.  It is one of the best known butterflies in South America. Its genome is nearly identical to D. plexippus, but the two are incompatible, and therefore considered separate species.

Description

Danaus erippus is included with other Nymphalidae, the largest family of butterflies with about 6000 species distributed throughout most of the world. It has a reduced pair of forelegs, is brightly coloured, and is included with popular species such as the emperors, admirals, tortoiseshells, and fritillaries. Until 2007, this butterfly was treated as a subspecies of Danaus plexippus. These species are very similar, but D. erippus usually has an orange trailing edge of the forewings, while in D. plexippus it is black. The lineages of the two species are thought to have separated about 2 million years ago. The colour of the wings in males of the southern monarch is paler than in the females.

Migration
Though, not as well known as the eastern North American monarch migratory phenomenon, it has been observed to move in a consistent spring/autumn manner by flying south in the autumn towards colder latitudes for the winter. Massive overwintering roosts have not yet been found.

Larval food plants
D. erippus, like D. plexippus, utilizes host plants that in the genus Asclepias including A. barjoniifolia, A. boliviensis, and A. curassavica, as well as some non-Asclepias (e.g., Astephanus geminiflorus, Cynanchum boerhaviifolium, Cynanchum atacamense, and Tweedia birostrata).

Distribution
This species can be found in tropical and subtropical latitudes of South America, mainly in  Brazil, Uruguay, Paraguay, Argentina, Bolivia, Chile, and southern Peru.

Gallery

References

Southern Monarch, Biolib
"Danaus Kluk, 1780" at Markku Savela's Lepidoptera and Some Other Life Forms
Dockx, Cristina (2002). Migration of the North American monarch Danaus plexippus to Cuba, PhD dissertation. University of Florida.

External links
Butterflies of America
National Geographic

Danaus (butterfly)
Nymphalidae of South America
Lepidoptera of Argentina
Lepidoptera of Brazil
Lepidoptera of Chile
Lepidoptera of Peru
Invertebrates of Bolivia
Invertebrates of Paraguay
Insects of Uruguay
Butterflies described in 1775
Taxa named by Pieter Cramer